The MAZ-530 is a Soviet-era heavy-duty dump truck with 6×4 wheels, produced at the Minsk Automobile Plant and Belarusian Automobile Works from 1957 to 1960 and from 1960 to 1963, respectively.

History 
In the 1950s the USSR manufactured biaxial MAZ-525 dump trucks with 25-ton carrying capacity. In the mid-1950s the MAZ plant created a larger model. The MAZ-530 had a similar layout to the MAZ-525, but becomes triaxial, thereby giving increasing payload capacity by 15 tons. The new model had a more powerful diesel V-shaped 12-cylinder D-12-450  engine. The new machine had two rear driving axles with an equalizer suspension, a frame representing the box beam and oversized tires 18.00-32.

The first prototype was ready in early March 1957. It appeared at the All-Soviet Agricultural exhibition  in Moscow. The 1958 MAZ-530 was exhibited at the World Industrial Exhibition in Brussels (Belgium), where it was awarded the Grand Prix. In 1960 production of MAZ-530 was transferred to a new car factory BelAZ in the village of  Zhodino near Minsk. As of 1963 three dozen MAZ/BelAZ-530 had been produced.

Project evaluation 
Comparable trucks were made only in the United States . It was the first and only 6×4 vehicle in the USSR. MAZ-530 had very good prospects, but was too late, as the 60's layout was obsolete. The BelAZ Design Bureau began the development of fundamentally new various capacity dump trucks, so MAZ-530 was discontinued. Cumulative production of 30 units was minuscule. No specimens remain.

External links 
 Scaling Bureau: MAZ-530 (Russian)
 MAZ-530 on OldRussianCars.com

530
Trucks of the Soviet Union
Dump trucks